Thomas Linière Taschereau (October 8, 1850 – May 29, 1901) was a lawyer and political figure in Quebec. He represented Beauce in the House of Commons of Canada from 1884 to 1887 as a Conservative Party of Canada member. His name appears in some sources as Jean-Thomas Linière Taschereau or Linière Taschereau.

He was born in Sainte-Marie, Canada East, the son of seigneur Thomas-Jacques Taschereau and Marie Anne Amable Fleury de la Gorgendière. Taschereau was educated at Ste. Anne de la Pocatiere, the Collège Sainte-Marie in Montreal and Université Laval. He entered the practice of law at Saint-Joseph-de-Beauce in 1873 and was named crown prosecutor for the Beauce district in 1881. He married Annie Breakey, the widow of William Berry, in 1874; she died the following year. In 1877, he married Mary, the daughter of Charles Joseph Alleyn. Taschereau was mayor of Saint-Joseph-de-Beauce from 1891 to 1893. He was first elected to the House of Commons in an 1884 by-election held after Joseph Bolduc was named to the Senate. Taschereau ran unsuccessfully in the federal riding of Kamouraska in 1896 and 1900. He died of heart disease in Quebec City at the age of 50.

His daughter Zoé-Mary Stella married Eugène Fiset who later served as lieutenant-governor of Quebec.

References 
 
 The Canadian Parliamentary Companion, 1885 JA Gemmill pp. 162–3

1850 births
1901 deaths
Conservative Party of Canada (1867–1942) MPs
Mayors of places in Quebec
Members of the House of Commons of Canada from Quebec
People from Sainte-Marie, Quebec
Thomas Liniere
Université Laval alumni